Stephan Fransen (born 8 August 1988) is a Dutch tennis player playing on the ATP Challenger Tour. On 7 June 2010, he reached his highest ATP singles ranking of 817 and his highest doubles ranking of 163 achieved on 18 November 2013.

Tour titles

Doubles

External links
 
 

1988 births
Living people
Dutch male tennis players
Sportspeople from The Hague